Crestview station is a former train station in Crestview, Florida. The station was built in 1993 when the Sunset Limited was extended east to Miami. Service to the station has been suspended since Hurricane Katrina struck the Gulf Coast in 2005.

Notable places
Britton Hill, highest point in Florida.

References

External links

Amtrak
Amtrak Stations Database

Former Amtrak stations in Florida
Transportation buildings and structures in Okaloosa County, Florida
Railway stations in the United States opened in 1993
Railway stations closed in 2005
1993 establishments in Florida
2005 disestablishments in Florida